RWJ-394674 is a drug that is used in scientific research. It is a potent, orally active analgesic drug that produces little respiratory depression. RWJ-394674 itself is a potent and selective agonist for δ-opioid receptors, with a Ki of 0.24 nM at δ and 72 nM at μ. However once inside the body, RWJ-394674 is dealkylated to its monodesethyl metabolite RWJ-413216, which is a potent agonist at the μ-opioid receptor and has less affinity for δ (Ki 0.26 nM at μ, 46.7 nM at δ). The effect of RWJ-394674 when administered in vivo thus produces potent agonist effects at both μ and δ receptors through the combined actions of the parent drug and its active metabolite, with the δ-agonist effects counteracting the respiratory depression from the μ-opioid effects, and the only prominent side-effect being sedation.

References 

Opioids
Delta-opioid receptor agonists
Tropanes
Benzamides
Mu-opioid receptor agonists